Amanda Gourgue is a New Hampshire politician.

Education
Gourgue earned an MBA in sustainability from Antioch University New England and a masters of environmental law and policy from Vermont Law School.

Career
On November 8, 2016, Gourgue was elected to the New Hampshire House of Representatives where she represents the Strafford 25 district. She assumed office later in 2016. She is a Democrat.

Personal life
Gourgue resides in Lee, New Hampshire.

References

Living people
People from Lee, New Hampshire
Antioch University New England alumni
Vermont Law and Graduate School alumni
Women state legislators in New Hampshire
Democratic Party members of the New Hampshire House of Representatives
21st-century American politicians
21st-century American women politicians
Year of birth missing (living people)